The Royal Bodyguard (RBG) of Bhutan is a part of the Royal Bhutan Army but independent as it is under the personal command of the King of Bhutan and is in charge of the security of the King of Bhutan (currently Jigme Khesar Namgyal Wangchuck) and other members of the Royal Family. The strength of the force is more than one thousand soldiers, and it is the most elite unit of the armed forces of the Kingdom of Bhutan. The commandant is Brigadier Pem Dorji.

The soldiers are well trained and well equipped with the latest armaments and training in all fields such as counter-terrorism, etc. The Royal Bodyguard of Bhutan proved themselves during brief conflict with northeastern extremist groups camped in Bhutan and under the personal command of the then fourth king of Bhutan, as the guards had no casualties and spearheaded most of the attacks.

Former commandant
Major General Dhendup Tshering was commissioned on 12 June 1971 from the Indian Military Academy. Prior to joining the Royal Bodyguard in 1973, he served in the Northern Borders. 

As a lieutenant colonel, he assumed the command of the Royal Bodyguard in 1988. In his 44 years of command, the general played a vital role in managing the anti-national crisis in 1990 and 2003 operations against the militants. The general is a recipient of Drakpoi Thugsey and Drakpoi Wangyel for his service to the Tsa-Wa-Sum.

Criticism
The RBG has been accused of arbitrarily detaining and torturing those who speak out against the Bhutanese monarchy. RBG soldiers have also been accused of murdering Lhotshampas in the south.

References

Military of Bhutan
Bhutanese monarchy
Royal guards
Guards regiments